There are currently 55 colleges and universities, defined as accredited, degree-granting, postsecondary institutions, in the state of Maryland.

The state's public universities are part of the University System of Maryland, with the exception of United States Naval Academy, St. Mary's College of Maryland and Morgan State University, which are public but are not part of the university system. The characteristics of each institution varies from small, intimate, liberal arts colleges such as Washington College and McDaniel College to large, public, research universities such as the University of Maryland, College Park. The oldest school in the state is St. John's College, formerly King William's School, founded in 1696, and the third oldest college or university in the United States. The newest school in the state is the Wor–Wic Community College founded in 1975. The University System of Maryland has two regional higher education centers where several state universities operate satellite programs, the University System of Maryland at Hagerstown founded in 2008 and the Universities at Shady Grove founded in 2000.

As of 2005, approximately 310,689 students (undergraduate, graduate, & professional) were enrolled at Maryland universities and colleges. In fall 2010, 369,320 students (undergraduate, graduate, & professional) enrolled at Maryland universities and colleges (increase of 18.87% since 2005), the highest such enrollment in State history. Women accounted for 57.5% of all students. For undergraduates, Maryland residents constituted 93% of enrollees at community colleges, 76.5% at public four-year institutions, and 54.4% at independent universities and colleges.
Universities and colleges in Maryland with regional accreditation are accredited by the Middle States Commission on Higher Education.

Public four-year colleges and universities

Private, non-profit colleges and universities

Public upper-division and graduate institutions or regional center campuses

Public two-year community colleges

Private, non-profit religious institutions

Maryland-based, accredited, for-profit institutions

Defunct Institutions

See also

 List of college athletic programs in Maryland
 Higher education in the United States
 Lists of American institutions of higher education
 List of recognized higher education accreditation organizations

References

External links

U.S. Department of Education listing of accredited institutions in Maryland

Maryland
Universities and colleges